There were five tennis events at the 2018 South American Games. The events were held from 28 May to 2 June.

Participating nations

Medalists

Medal table

External links
 2018 South American Games – Tennis 

 
Tennis
South American Games
2018
2018 South American Games
Qualification tournaments for the 2019 Pan American Games